Anna Mifková (born 5 June 1943) is a Czech volleyball player. She competed at the 1968 Summer Olympics and the 1972 Summer Olympics.

References

External links
 
 

1943 births
Living people
Czech women's volleyball players
Olympic volleyball players of Czechoslovakia
Volleyball players at the 1968 Summer Olympics
Volleyball players at the 1972 Summer Olympics
People from Znojmo District
Sportspeople from the South Moravian Region